John Hensleigh Allen  (29 August 1769 – 12 April 1843) was the Whig member of parliament for Pembroke elected at the 1818 United Kingdom general election until the 1826 United Kingdom general election.

He was the son of John Bartlett Allen (1733–1792) a local landowner and colliery owner and his first wife Elizabeth Hensleigh.  He had 9 sisters, and his brothers-in-law included Josiah Wedgwood II, Sir James Mackintosh (both Whig MPs), John Wedgwood the horticulturist and Jean Charles Léonard de Sismondi the historian.

He was educated at Westminster School and Trinity College, Cambridge, following his elder brother Lancelot Baugh Allen.

He was High Sheriff of Pembrokeshire in 1809.

He married Gertrude, daughter of Lord Robert Seymour, on 9 November 1812.  They had five children:
 Gertrude Elizabeth Allen (died 1824)
 Seymour Phillips Allen (1814–1861)
 Henry George Allen (1815–1908)
 John Hensleigh Allen (1818–1868)
 Isabel Georgina Allen (1820–1914), married George Lort Phillips

References 

1769 births
1843 deaths
Alumni of Trinity College, Cambridge
Deputy Lieutenants of Pembrokeshire
High Sheriffs of Pembrokeshire
Members of Lincoln's Inn
Members of the Parliament of the United Kingdom for Pembrokeshire constituencies
People educated at Westminster School, London
UK MPs 1818–1820
UK MPs 1820–1826
Whig (British political party) MPs for Welsh constituencies